Jefferson County is a county located in the U.S. state of Georgia. As of the 2020 census, the population was 15,709. The county seat is Louisville. The county was created on February 20, 1796, and named for Thomas Jefferson, the main author of the Declaration of Independence who became the third president of the United States.

Geography

The small northern portion of Jefferson County, defined by a line running from Stapleton southeast and just south of State Route 80, is located in the Brier Creek sub-basin of the Savannah River basin. The entire rest of the county is located in the Upper Ogeechee River sub-basin of the Ogeechee River basin.

Major highways

  U.S. Route 1
  U.S. Route 1 Business (Louisville)
  U.S. Route 1 Business (Wadley)
  U.S. Route 221
  U.S. Route 319
  State Route 4
  State Route 4 Business (Louisville)
  State Route 4 Business (Wadley)
  State Route 17
  State Route 24
  State Route 47
  State Route 78
  State Route 80
  State Route 88
  State Route 102
  State Route 171
  State Route 242
  State Route 296
  State Route 540 (Fall Line Freeway)

Adjacent counties

 McDuffie County - north
 Richmond County - northeast
 Burke County - east
 Emanuel County - south
 Johnson County - southwest
 Glascock County - northwest
 Washington County - west
 Warren County - northwest

Demographics

2020 census

As of the 2020 United States census, there were 15,709 people, 5,664 households, and 3,598 families residing in the county.

2010 census
As of the 2010 United States Census, there were 16,930 people, 6,241 households, and 4,407 families residing in the county. The racial makeup of the county was 54.4% black or African American, 42.6% white, 0.4% Asian, 0.1% American Indian, 1.6% from other races, and 0.9% from two or more races. Those of Hispanic or Latino origin made up 3.1% of the population. In terms of ancestry, and 26.7% were American.

Of the 6,241 households, 36.0% had children under the age of 18 living with them, 41.9% were married couples living together, 23.4% had a female householder with no husband present, 29.4% were non-families, and 26.0% of all households were made up of individuals. The average household size was 2.63 and the average family size was 3.16. The median age was 38.8 years.

The median income for a household in the county was $29,268 and the median income for a family was $36,980. Males had a median income of $36,284 versus $27,191 for females. The per capita income for the county was $15,165. About 19.0% of families and 26.9% of the population were below the poverty line, including 40.7% of those under age 18 and 24.8% of those age 65 or over.

Education

Communities

Cities
 Avera
 Louisville (county seat)
 Stapleton
 Wadley
 Wrens

Towns
 Bartow
 Matthews

Politics
Jefferson County trends Democratic in presidential elections; having last supported a Republican in 1988 when it voted for George HW Bush.George W. Bush came within 381 votes of carrying the county in 2004. In the 2022 midterms, Governor Brian Kemp is presumably the first Republican to win statewide in Jefferson County since Sonny Perdue's re-election in 2006.It is now a Democratic-leaning swing county

See also

 Central Savannah River Area
 National Register of Historic Places listings in Jefferson County, Georgia
List of counties in Georgia

References

External links
  The Jefferson County Information Center Website
  The Friends of Historic Downtown Louisville Website
  The Fire House Gallery Website - Contemporary art in Jefferson County
  Videos about life in Jefferson County by Fire Team Productions
 A genealogy table for Jefferson County, Georgia ←Broken link, December 2015.
 USA Today Q&A with Jefferson County High principal Molly Howard
 The News and Farmer and Wadley Herald/ Jefferson Reporter, the county's weekly newspaper and the oldest weekly in Georgia
 The Official Jefferson County Economic Development Website
 General Wood's Fort historical marker
 Old Savannah Road historical marker
 Old Town Plantation historical marker
 Rocky Comfort Creek historical marker
 Yazoo Fraud historical marker

 
Georgia (U.S. state) counties
1796 establishments in Georgia (U.S. state)
Populated places established in 1796
Black Belt (U.S. region)
Majority-minority counties in Georgia